Dorothy Hall may refer to:

 Dorothy Hall (actress), 1920s silent film actress
 Dorothy Manley, 1940s–50s British athlete, sometimes called by her married name "Dorothy Hall"
 Dorothy Hall (scientist), scientist known for her research on snow and ice
 "Dorothy Hall", a historic building at Tuskegee University, Alabama

Hall, Dorothy